Baseball was contested at the Far Eastern Championship Games and was one of the main eight sports on the programme.

Among the three regular nations, the Philippines and Japan were the most developed in terms of baseball. Filipino baseball grew in popularity during the American colonial period at the turn of the 20th century, while baseball in Japan had an even longer history, having been first introduced in 1872. Correspondingly, over the ten editions of the games the Philippines won the baseball competition on six occasions to Japan's four victories. China never won the Far Eastern Championship Games baseball title.

Editions

Medal summary
As 1934

References

Far Eastern Games
Far Eastern Championship Games
Far Eastern Championship Games